The Bukobay Svita (also anglicized as Bukobay or Bukobai Formation) is a Middle Triassic geological unit in Russia. It is composed primarily of red or grey lacustrine sediments, reconstructing a humid and marshy depositional environment. Bukobay is the youngest section of a Triassic terrestrial succession exposed south of the Ural Mountains. It is equivalent to a biostratigraphic unit, the Bukobay Gorizont, which is also called the "Bukobay Horizon" or "Mastodonsaurus" fauna).

Fossil content 
Notable components of the Bukobay fauna include "Mastodonsaurus" torvus (a giant capitosaur amphibian), Malutinisuchus gratus and Energosuchus garjainovi, the insect Mesoneta uralensis, Elephantosaurus jachimovitschi (a large dicynodont), and Chalishevia cothurnata (the youngest known erythrosuchid). Temnospondyls include Bukobaja enigmatica, Cyclotosaurus, Plagioscutum caspiense and Plagiorophus paraboliceps, with Ceratodus orenburgensis and C. bucobaensis as fish. The flora is also diverse, including Equisetites arenaceus (a species of giant horsetails) and Ladinian-age palynomorphs.

See also 

 Triassic land vertebrate faunachrons
 Erfurt Formation, contemporaneous fossiliferous formation of Germany
 Wetterstein Formation, contemporaneous fossiliferous formation of the Alps
 Omingonde Formation, contemporaneous fossiliferous formation of Namibia
 Santa Maria Formation, contemporaneous fossiliferous formation of Brazil

References

Bibliography

Further reading 
 I. A. Dobruskina. 1982. Triassic Floras of Eurasia. Akademia Nauk SSSR, Transactions 365:1-196

Geologic formations of Russia
Triassic System of Europe
Triassic Russia
Ladinian Stage
Sandstone formations
Siltstone formations
Alluvial deposits
Lacustrine deposits
Paleontology in Russia
Formations